This Love is Hong Kong Mandopop artist Khalil Fong's second Mandarin album. It was released on 29 December 2006 by Warner Music Hong Kong.  The theme of the album was "different types of love".  "四人遊" is a duet with Fiona Sit.  "If You Leave Me Now" is a cover of rock band Chicago's 1976 hit ballad "If You Leave Me Now".  On 1 March 2007, a special edition with DVD, which includes music videos of "四人遊", "愛愛愛" and "蘇麗珍", and also "春風吹", "南音" and "妹妹" from Fong's debut album Soulboy.

The album was awarded one of the Top 10 Selling Mandarin Albums of the Year at the 2007 IFPI Hong Kong Album Sales Awards, presented by the Hong Kong branch of IFPI.

Track listing

References

External links
  Khalil Fong discography

2006 albums
Khalil Fong albums